Temple Lodge  is a Grade II listed building at 51 Queen Caroline Street, Hammersmith, London, W6 9QL.

The house dates from the early 19th century. The attached studio to the right was created in about 1908 by the artist Frank Brangwyn.

References

Grade II listed buildings in the London Borough of Hammersmith and Fulham
Grade II listed houses in London
Houses in the London Borough of Hammersmith and Fulham
Houses completed in the 19th century